Baden-Württemberg, commonly shortened to BW or BaWü, is a German state in Southwest Germany, east of the Rhine, which forms the southern part of Germany's western border with France. As a federated state, Baden-Württemberg is a partly-sovereign parliamentary republic. The largest city in Baden-Württemberg is the state capital of Stuttgart, followed by Mannheim and Karlsruhe. Other major cities are Freiburg im Breisgau, Heidelberg, Heilbronn, Pforzheim, Reutlingen, Tübingen, and Ulm.

What is now Baden-Württemberg was formerly the historical territories of Baden, Prussian Hohenzollern, and Württemberg. Baden-Württemberg became a state of West Germany in April 1952 by the merger of South Baden, Württemberg-Baden, and Württemberg-Hohenzollern. These three states had been artificially created by the Allies after World War II out of the existing traditional states by their separation over different occupation zones.

Baden-Württemberg is especially known for its strong economy with various industries like car manufacturing, electrical engineering, mechanical engineering, the service sector, and more. It has the third-highest gross regional product (GRP) in Germany. Part of the Four Motors for Europe, some of the largest German companies are headquartered in Baden-Württemberg, including Mercedes-Benz Group, Schwarz Group, Porsche, Bosch and SAP.

The sobriquet , a diminutive of the word  in the local Swabian, Alemannic and Franconian dialects, is sometimes used as a synonym for Baden-Württemberg.

History

Baden-Württemberg is formed from the historical territories of Baden, Prussian Hohenzollern, and Württemberg. Baden spans along the flat right bank of the river Rhine from north-west to the south (Lake Constance) of the present state, whereas Württemberg and Hohenzollern lay more inland and hillier, including areas such as the Swabian Jura mountain range. The Black Forest formed part of the border between Baden and Württemberg.

In 100 AD, the Roman Empire invaded and occupied Württemberg, constructing a limes along its northern borders. Over the course of the third century AD, the Alemanni forced the Romans to retreat west beyond the Rhine and Danube rivers. In 496 AD the Alemanni were defeated by a Frankish invasion led by Clovis I.

The Holy Roman Empire was later established. The majority of people in this region continued to be Roman Catholics, even after the Protestant Reformation influenced populations in northern Germany.

In the late 18th and early 19th century, Künzelsau, the capital of the Hohenlohe district, became the centre of emigration to the UK of pork butchers and bacon factors. The pioneers noticed a niche for speciality pork products in the rapidly growing English cities, especially those in the industrial centre and North. Many married local women and sent word home that a good living could be made in England; others followed.

In the late 19th and early 20th centuries, numerous people emigrated from this primarily rural area to the United States for economic reasons.

20th century to present
In the beginning of the 20th century, the territory of modern-day Baden-Württemberg consisted of the Grand Duchy of Baden, the Kingdom of Württemberg and the province of Hohenzollern of the Kingdom of Prussia. Since 1871, these had been part of the German Empire. In the aftermath of World War I and as part of the German revolution of 1918, the monarchs of Baden, Württemberg and Prussia were deposed, and these states became democratic republics: the Republic of Baden, the Free People's State of Württemberg and the Free State of Prussia. 

Following Adolf Hitler becoming chancellor of Germany in 1933, the democratic institutions of Baden, Württemberg and Prussia were abolished as part of the Gleichschaltung.

After World War II, the Allies established three states in the territory of modern-day Baden-Württemberg: (South) Baden, Württemberg-Baden and Württemberg-Hohenzollern. Baden and Württemberg-Hohenzollern were occupied by France, while Württemberg-Baden was occupied by the United States. The new artificial borders were a consequence of France requesting its own occupation zone in Germany after World War II, and the Americans' wish to keep the A8 motorway, which spans east-west across northern Baden and northern Württemberg, wholly within their occupation zone.

In 1949, each state became a founding member of the Federal Republic of Germany (West Germany), with Article 118 of the German constitution providing an accession procedure. On 9 December 1951, a referendum was held in Württemberg-Baden, Württemberg-Hohenzollern and (South) Baden over a possible merger, or the restoration of the former pre-war states. There was strong support for the merger in Württemberg and Hohenzollern, but opposition in Baden. While a majority in the historic area of Baden (52%) voted to restore the former pre-war states, the majority of voters overall (69%) voted in favor of a merger. Baden-Württemberg officially became a state on 25 April 1952.

There were still opponents to the merger of Baden and Württemberg, however. In 1956 the Federal Constitutional Court decided that the population of Baden should have their say in a separate referendum. The second referendum was delayed, however, and the Federal Constitutional Court decided in 1969 that another referendum should be held by 30 June 1970. The referendum in the historic area of Baden was finally held on 7 June 1970, with 81.9% of the voters voting in favour of the merger of Baden and Württemberg.

Geography
Baden-Württemberg shares borders with the German states of Rhineland Palatinate, Hesse, and Bavaria, and also shares borders with France (Alsace, within the region of Grand Est), and Switzerland (cantons of Basel-Landschaft, Basel-Stadt, Aargau, Zürich, Schaffhausen and Thurgau).

Most of the major cities of Baden-Württemberg straddle the banks of the Neckar River, which runs downstream (from southwest to the centre, then northwest) through the state past Tübingen, Stuttgart, Heilbronn, Heidelberg, and Mannheim.

The Rhine forms the western border as well as large portions of the southern border. The Black Forest (Schwarzwald), the central mountain range of the state, rises east of the Upper Rhine valley. The high plateau of the Swabian Alb, between the Neckar, the Black Forest, and the Danube, is an essential European watershed. Baden-Württemberg shares Lake Constance (Bodensee, also known regionally as the Swabian Sea) with Switzerland, Austria and Bavaria, the international borders within its waters not being clearly defined. It shares the foothills of the Alps (known as the Allgäu) with Bavaria and the Austrian Vorarlberg, but Baden-Württemberg itself has no mainland border with Austria.

The Danube is conventionally taken to be formed by the confluence of the two streams Brigach and Breg just east of Donaueschingen.
The source of the Donaubach, which flows into the Danube, in Donaueschingen is often referred to as the "source of the Danube" (Donauquelle). Hydrologically, the source of the Danube is the source of the Breg as the larger of the two formative streams, which rises near Furtwangen.

Mountains

Hills 
Lemberg (Affalterbach)

Climate 

Baden-Württemberg is – along with Bavaria – the southernmost part of Germany. 

The climate across the states varies. This is mostly due to a high amount of mountains and highlands inside of the state. Most parts in the western parts (Baden) lower than  enjoy an almost year round warm, in the Upper Rhine Valley and Lake Constance area even a subtropical climate, influenced frequently by air masses from the Mediterranean Sea. Summers here are mostly dry, winters wet and foggy. 

The highlands and also some lower parts in the eastern side of the state, do have more temperate temperatures, especially in summer. While winters in the warmest areas is often not having any snow, the Black Forest, Swabian Alb and the Alps tend to get snow frequently, especially in very high parts. Summers here have more rain than in the valleys, but winters tend to have more sun. 

Government

Administration

Baden-Württemberg is divided into thirty-five districts (Landkreise) and nine independent cities (Stadtkreise), both grouped into the four Administrative Districts (Regierungsbezirke) of Freiburg, Karlsruhe, Stuttgart, and Tübingen.

 The 35 districts:

Baden-Württemberg contains nine additional independent cities not belonging to any district:

Other state institutions
The Baden-Württemberg General Auditing Office acts as an independent body to monitor public offices' correct use of public funds.

Politics

The state parliament of Baden-Württemberg is the Landtag, located in Stuttgart. The state government is currently formed by a Greens-CDU coalition as the third cabinet of Minister-President Winfried Kretschmann (Greens). 

The politics of Baden-Württemberg have traditionally been dominated by the conservative Christian Democratic Union of Germany (CDU), which had led all but one government since 1952 until 2011. In the Landtag elections held on 27 March 2011, voters replaced the Christian Democrats and centre-right Free Democrats (FDP) coalition with an alliance of the Greens and Social Democrats (SPD), which secured a four-seat majority in the state parliament. The alliance elected the Greens-led first Kretschmann cabinet under Winfried Kretschmann because the Greens had surprisingly won 36 seats, one more than the Social Democrats' 35 seats. In the 2016 election, the Greens and their popular Winfried Kretschmann were reelected by the voters and, with their nationwide best result, turned out first place for the first time in any election in German history. However, because of heavy losses for the Social Democrats, the Greens formed a coalition government with the Christian Democrats, the second Kretschmann cabinet. After the most recent election in 2021, the Greens-CDU coalition was upheld.

Most recent election results

Economy

Although Baden-Württemberg has relatively few natural resources compared to other regions of Germany, the state is among the most prosperous and wealthiest regions in Europe with a generally low unemployment rate historically. The state's economic performance benefits from and relies on its well-developed infrastructure. Apart from the city-states of Berlin, Bremen and Hamburg, Baden-Württemberg offers the fourth-shortest routes to trains and buses on average among all German states.

Baden-Württemberg has the highest exports (2019) and third-highest imports (2020), the second-lowest unemployment rate with 4.3% (March 2021), the most patents pending per capita (2020), the second-highest absolute and highest relative number of companies considered "hidden champions", and the highest absolute and relative research and development expenditure (2017) among all states in Germany, as well as the highest measured Innovationsindex (2012), making it the German state with the third-highest gross regional product (GRP)  (behind North Rhine-Westphalia and Bavaria) with €524,325 billion (around US$636.268 billion). Baden-Württemberg also has the most employees (233,296) in the automotive industry of all German states , as well as the third-highest number of motor vehicles of all German states (2020). If Baden-Württemberg were a sovereign country (2020), it would have an economy comparable to that of Sweden in terms of nominal gross domestic product (GDP).

A number of well-known enterprises are headquartered in the state, for example Mercedes-Benz Group, Porsche, Robert Bosch GmbH (automobile industry), Carl Zeiss AG (optics), SAP (Europe's most valuable brand as well as the largest non-American software enterprise) and Heidelberger Druckmaschinen (precision mechanical engineering). Despite this, Baden-Württemberg's economy is dominated by small and medium-sized enterprises, like most companies in German-speaking countries are. Although poor in workable natural resources (formerly lead, zinc, iron, silver, copper, and salts) and still very rural in some areas, the region is heavily industrialised overall. In 2003, there were almost 8,800 manufacturing enterprises with more than 20 employees, but only 384 with more than 500. There are 3,779 companies in Baden-Württemberg corporate family which come to 1000-5000 employees in total. 

The latter category accounts for 43% of the 1.2 million persons employed in the industry. The Mittelstand or mid-sized company model is the backbone of the Baden-Württemberg economy. Medium-sized businesses and a tradition of branching into different industrial sectors have ensured specialisation over a wide range. A fifth of the "old" Federal Republic's industrial gross value added is generated by Baden-Württemberg. Turnover for manufacturing in 2003 exceeded 240,000 million, 43% of which came from exports. The region depends to some extent on global economic developments, though the great adaptability of the region's economy has generally helped it through crises. Half of the employees in the manufacturing industry are in mechanical and electrical engineering and automobile construction. This is also where the largest enterprises are to be found. The importance of the precision mechanics industry also extends beyond the region's borders, as does that of the optical, clock making, toy, metallurgy and electronics industries. The textile industry, which formerly dominated much of the region, has disappeared from Baden-Württemberg. Research and development (R&D) is funded jointly by the state and industry. In 2001, more than a fifth of the 100,000 or so persons working in R&D in Germany were located in Baden-Württemberg, most of them in the Stuttgart area. Baden-Württemberg is also the region with the highest GDP of the Four Motors for Europe.

A study performed in 2007 by the neo-liberal thinktank Initiative for New Social Market Economy and the trade newspaper Wirtschaftswoche awarded Baden-Württemberg for being the "economically most successful and most dynamic state" among the 16 states.

The unemployment rate stood at 3% in October 2018 and was the second lowest in Germany behind only Bavaria and one of the lowest in the European Union.

Tourism

Baden-Württemberg is a popular holiday destination. Main sights include the capital and biggest city, Stuttgart, modern and historical at the same time, with its urban architecture and atmosphere (and famously, its inner-city parks and historic Wilhelma zoo), its castles (such as Castle Solitude), its museums as well as a rich cultural programme (theatre, opera) and mineral spring baths in Bad Cannstatt (also the site of a Roman Castra); it is the only major city in Germany with vineyards in an urban territory.

The residential (court) towns of Ludwigsburg and Karlsruhe, the spas and casino of luxurious Baden-Baden, the medieval architecture of Ulm (Ulm Münster is the tallest church in the world), the vibrant, young, but traditional university towns of Heidelberg and Tübingen with their old castles looking out above the river Neckar, are popular smaller towns. Sites of former monasteries such as the ones on Reichenau Island and at Maulbronn (both World Heritage Sites) as well as Bebenhausen Abbey are to be found. Baden-Württemberg also boasts rich old Free Imperial Cities such as Biberach, Esslingen am Neckar, Heilbronn, Ravensburg, Reutlingen, Künzelsau, Schwäbisch Hall and Aalen as well as the southernmost and sunniest city of Germany, Freiburg, close to Alsace and Switzerland, being an ideal base for exploring the heights of the nearby Black Forest (e.g., for skiing in winter or for hiking in summer) with its traditional villages and the surrounding wine country of the Rhine Valley of South Baden.

The countryside of the lush Upper Neckar valley (where Rottweil is famous for its Fastnacht carnival) and the pristine Danube valley Swabian Alb (with Hohenzollern Castle and Sigmaringen Castle), as well as the largely pristine Swabian Forest, the Upper Rhine Valley, and Lake Constance, where all kinds of water sports are popular, with the former Imperial, today border town of Konstanz (where the Council of Constance took place), the Neolithic and Bronze Age village at Unteruhldingen, the flower island of Mainau, and the hometown of the Zeppelin, Friedrichshafen a.o., are especially popular for outdoor activities in the summer months.

In spring and autumn (April/May and September/October), beer festivals (fun fairs) take place at the Cannstatter Wasen in Stuttgart. The Cannstatter Volksfest, in the autumn, is the second-largest such festival in the world after the Munich Oktoberfest. In late November and early December Christmas markets are a tourist magnet in all major towns, the largest being in Stuttgart during the three weeks before Christmas.

The Bertha Benz Memorial Route is a 194 km signposted scenic route from Mannheim via Heidelberg and Wiesloch to Pforzheim and back, which follows the route of the world's first long-distance journey by automobile which Bertha Benz undertook in August 1888.

Baden-Württemberg also contains Europa-Park in Rust. The largest theme park in Germany, and the second most popular theme park in Europe, after Disneyland Paris.

Companies owned by Baden-Württemberg

Education

Baden-Württemberg is home to some of the oldest, most renowned, and prestigious universities in Germany, such as the universities of Heidelberg (founded in 1386, the oldest university within the territory of modern Germany), Freiburg (founded in 1457), and Tübingen (founded in 1477). It also contains three of the eleven German excellence universities (Heidelberg, Tübingen, and Konstanz and formerly, Freiburg and Karlsruhe).

Other university towns are Mannheim and Ulm. Furthermore, two universities are located in the state capital Stuttgart, the University of Hohenheim, and the University of Stuttgart. Ludwigsburg is home to the renowned national film school Filmakademie Baden-Württemberg (Film Academy Baden-Wuerttemberg). The private International University in Germany was situated in Bruchsal, but closed in 2009. Another private university is located in Friedrichshafen, Zeppelin University.

Furthermore, there are more than a dozen Fachhochschulen, i.e., universities of applied sciences, as well as Pädagogische Hochschulen, i.e., teacher training colleges, and other institutions of tertiary education in Baden-Württemberg. Pforzheim University is one of the oldest Fachhochschulen in Germany which is renowned and highly ranked for its Engineering and MBA programs.

The state has the highest density of universities of any state in Germany.

Transport

Railway 

Railways form a major part of the transport infrastructure in Baden-Württemberg. As part of high-speed rail in Germany, the Mannheim–Stuttgart and Stuttgart–Ulm high-speed lines were built, and the Karlsruhe–Basel high-speed line, paralleling the traditional Mannheim–Karlsruhe–Basel railway, is currently under construction. In and around Stuttgart, the old terminal station is currently being replaced with an underground through station as part of the controversial Stuttgart 21 project.

Passenger train services in Baden-Württemberg are operated partly by various subsidiaries of Deutsche Bahn, the national railway operator, such as DB Fernverkehr with its high-speed ICE, as well as IC trains; and DB Regio, operating some regional train services in the state. Cross-border train services are also provided by French Railways' TGV trains, as well as by Swiss Federal Railways and Austrian Federal Railways (including its Nightjet night trains).

Since the 1990s, the around 120 individual regional train services in Baden-Württemberg have been managed by the state-owned Nahverkehrsgesellschaft Baden-Württemberg (NVBW), which has started to commercially tender out these train operations. DB Regio, SWEG, HzL, AVG and WEG have been joined in operating regional trains by Abellio, Agilis, Bodensee-Oberschwaben-Bahn, Go-Ahead, SBB, Schwäbische Alb-Bahn and VIAS, which entered the market.

Starting in the 1970s, regional rail around major cities has been transformed into high-frequent S-Bahn networks, currently the following systems exist (partly) in Baden-Württemberg: Stuttgart S-Bahn, Rhine-Neckar S-Bahn, Breisgau S-Bahn and Basel S-Bahn. In and around the cities of Karlsruhe and Heilbronn, the Karlsruhe Stadtbahn system combines elements of traditional S-Bahns with tram operations within the urban cores (tram-trains).

In Württemberg, the Royal State Railways opened their first line on 22 October 1845 between two present-day suburbs of Stuttgart. In 1900, the Hohenzollerische Landesbahn (HzL) was founded to expand the rail system in the Prussian province, which had previously only been served by short sections of Württemberg lines passing through "foreign" territory. After the construction of the main lines, various private or local government initiatives constructed branch or local railway lines, some of which survive today as AVG, SWEG, RNV or WEG lines. In 1920, the Baden and Württemberg state railways merged with other state railways to form Deutsche Reichsbahn, which was replaced by Deutsche Bundesbahn after World War II. A lot of smaller railway lines, both DB and remaining local or private lines, closed in the decades after World War II, or were at least run-down with minimal service for passengers. Since the 1990s, some of these lines have been revived and revitalised marking good examples for increased ridership through attractive trains and timetables, with some examples being the Kraichgau Railway (taken over by AVG) and the Schönbuch Railway (reopened by WEG).

A popular TV programme portraying railways around Germany and the world, Eisenbahn-Romantik, originates in Baden-Württemberg and is produced by its public broadcaster SWR.

Urban public transport 

Baden-Württemberg's area is covered by 19 Verkehrsverbünde (transport associations), organising and managing local public transport, as well as ensuring harmonised fares between different bus and train operators. For inter-Verbünde journeys, the bwtarif, created in 2018, offers seamless tickets across the state.

As of 2023, tram and light rail systems exist in Freiburg, Heidelberg, Heilbronn, Karlsruhe, Mannheim, Stuttgart and Ulm. International tram lines also reach Baden-Württemberg: Basel's tram 8 serves Weil am Rhein, while Strasbourg's tram D extends to Kehl. There is also a trolleybus system in Esslingen am Neckar.

Demographics

The population of Baden-Württemberg was 10,486,660 in 2014, of which 5,354,105 were female and 5,132,555 male. In 2006, the birth rate of 8.61 per 1000 was almost equal to the death rate of 8.60 per 1000. 14.87 per cent of the population was under the age of 15, whereas the proportion of people aged 65 and older was at 18.99 per cent (2008). The dependency ratio–the ratio of people aged under 15 and over 64 in comparison to the working-age population (aged 15–64)–was 512 per 1000 (2008). In 2018, Baden-Württemberg ranked 2 on the Human Development Index (HDI) among all states in Germany, after Hamburg. With an average life expectancy of 79.8 years for men and 84.2 years for women (2017–2019 life table), Baden-Württemberg ranks first in this category among all states in Germany for both sexes.

Baden-Württemberg has long been a preferred destination of immigrants. , almost 28% of its population had a migration background as defined by the Federal Statistical Office of Germany; this number clearly surpassed the German average of 21% and was higher than in any other German state with the exception of the city states of Hamburg and Bremen. , 9,355,239 of the population held German citizenship, whereas 1,131,421 were foreign nationals.

Vital statistics
Births from January–March 2017 =  25,454
Births from January–March 2018 =  25,161
Deaths from January–March 2017 =  31,767
Deaths from January–March 2018 =  31,725
Natural growth from January–March 2017 =  -6,313
Natural growth from January–March 2018 =  -6,564

Religion

Northern and most of central Württemberg has been traditionally Protestant (particularly Lutheran) since the Reformation in 1534 (with its centre at the famous Tübinger Stift). The former Electorate of the Palatinate (Northwestern Baden) with its capital Heidelberg was shaped by Calvinism before being integrated into Baden. Upper Swabia, and the Upper Neckar Valley up to the bishop seat of Rottenburg, and Southern Baden (the Catholic archbishop has its seat in Freiburg) have traditionally been bastions of Roman Catholicism. Catholics have a very narrow plurality in the state, with 6% of the population adhering to Islam and 24% of the population disclaiming any religion or adhering to other faiths.

Sports

Football 
Football is the biggest sport in Baden-Württemberg. Clubs currently competing in the Bundesliga include SC Freiburg, TSG 1899 Hoffenheim and the most successful club in the state, VfB Stuttgart, meanwhile Karlsruher SC, 1. FC Heidenheim, SV Sandhausen and Waldhof Mannheim also compete in the top three German soccer divisions.

Handball
Handball-Bundesliga multiple champions Frisch Auf Göppingen and Rhein-Neckar Löwen, as well as TVB 1898 Stuttgart are based in Baden-Württemberg. Frisch Auf Göppingen won EHF Champions League (Europe's premier club tournament) twice, in 1960 and 1962. Several major women's handball clubs are also based here, including 3-time Frauen Bundesliga champions SG BBM Bietigheim.

Basketball 
Compared to other German states, Baden-Württemberg has a particularly high density of professional basketball teams such as Riesen Ludwigsburg, ratiopharm Ulm, USC Heidelberg, PS Karlsruhe Lions and others.

Ice hockey 
One of the most decorated German ice hockey clubs, Adler Mannheim, is based in the city of Mannheim. Other DEL clubs, such as Bietigheim Steelers and Schwenninger Wild Wings are also based in the state.

Volleyball 
Baden-Württemberg is home to the most successful club in German volleyball history, the Volleyball-Bundesliga club VfB Friedrichshafen, which won CEV Champions League in 2006–07 season.

Motorsport 
There are also multiple motorsport facilities, the most famous one being long-time Formula One circuit Hockenheimring.

Dialects 
Two dialect groups of German are spoken in Baden-Württemberg in various variants: Alemannic and Franconian dialects. In central and southern Württemberg, the Alemannic dialect of Swabian is spoken (slightly differing even within the area, e.g., between Upper Swabia, the Swabian Alb, and the central Neckar Valley of the Stuttgart region). In South Baden, the local dialects are Low Alemannic and High Alemannic (i.e., variants of what is also Swiss German). In the northern part of Baden, i.e., the area around Karlsruhe, Heilbronn and Mosbach, South Franconian dialects are predominant. In the Kurpfalz, however, with the cities of Heidelberg and Mannheim, the idiom is Rhine Franconian (i.e., Palatinate German), while in the Northeast of Baden-Württemberg East Franconian is spoken.

The same or similar Alemannic dialects are also spoken in the neighboring regions, especially in Bavarian Swabia, Alsace (Alsatian), German-speaking Switzerland (Swiss German), and the Austrian Vorarlberg. In contrast, the other Franconian dialects range from the Netherlands over the Rhineland, Lorraine, and Hesse up to Franconia in northern Bavaria.

Yiddish and Pleißne were spoken while Romani is still being used by some.

A variant of the Alemannic German of Baden developed into the Colonia Tovar dialect, spoken by descendants of immigrants from Baden who went to Venezuela in 1843.

Foreigners 
, the largest groups of foreign residents by country of origin were:

See also

 List of ministers-president of Baden-Württemberg
 Käpfle
 List of places in Baden-Württemberg
 Four Motors for Europe
 History of Baden-Württemberg
 Türnleberg
 Württemberg
 Coat of arms of Württemberg
 County of Württemberg
 Duchy of Württemberg
 Electorate of Württemberg
 Kingdom of Württemberg
 Baden
 Coat of arms of Baden
 Margraviate of Baden, for the 16th-18th century state
 Electorate of Baden, for the Napoleonic state
 Grand Duchy of Baden, for the state that existed from 1808–1918
 Republic of Baden, for the state that existed from 1918–1945
 Rulers of Baden, for a list of sovereigns and presidents

Sources

Notes

References

 
 Climate change in Baden-Württemberg: facts – impacts – perspectives / LUBW; Baden-Württemberg, Ministerium für Umwelt, Naturschutz und Verkehr. [In collab. with Karlsruhe Institute of Technology (KIT), Institute for Meteorology and Climate Research; Süddeutsches Klimabüro. Transl.: InTra eG Fachübersetzergenossenschaft], Stuttgart: Baden-Württemberg Ministry of the Environment, Nature Conservation and Transport Karlsruhe: LUBW, 2010.

External links

 
 
 

 
NUTS 1 statistical regions of the European Union
States and territories established in 1952
1952 establishments in West Germany
States of Germany